is the two old maps that shows the precincts of  on  and  at the foot of Mount Hiei, Otsu City, Shiga Prefecture, Japan. The maps was made in 1767 (the middle of the Edo period, Japan). The author is unknown.

 The 1st volume of the maps shows  in the precincts of Enryakuji Temple on Mount Hiei and Sakamoto area at the foot of Mount Hiei.

Meaning of the title 

The meaning of the title, Sanmon-Santō Sakamoto Sōezu, is "the whole map of the three areas of Enryakuji Temple on Mount Hiei and the area of Sakamoto".

The meanings of the words that make up the title, Sanmon-Santō Sakamoto Sōezu, are as follows.

 The word  is the another name of Enryakuji Temple on Mount Hiei.

 The word  refers to the Sakamoto area at the eastern foot of Mount Hiei (present-day Sakamoto, Otsu City, Shiga Prefecture, Japan).

 The word  means "whole" or "all".

 The word  had used before  to mean what we call a "map" today.

As a historical document 
Enryakuji Temple is registered as a UNESCO World Heritage Site as one of the 17 temples and shrines that make up the Historic Monuments of Ancient Kyoto (Kyoto, Uji and Otsu Cities). In addition, Enryakuji Temple possesses several Japanese national treasures, including , and numerous Japanese important cultural properties. Therefore, Enryakuji Temple is a historically and culturally important place, and it once had possessed far more cultural properties and historical documents than are still in existence.

But the enormous cultural properties and historical documents of Enryakuji Temple suffered damage from the Siege of Mount Hiei in 1571 and much of these were lost. Currently, there are only a few historical documents that can tell us what the precincts of Enryakuji Temple in the past looked like.

Sanmon-Santō Sakamoto Sōezu is probably the most detailed pictorial old maps of the precincts of Enryakuji Temple in existence and also shows the halls of temples and shrines that may have existed before 1571. Therefore, these maps are valuable historical documents to know about what the precincts in the past looked like.

Repository 
Currently, these maps are one of the collections in the National Archives of Japan (NAJ). (These maps were formerly one of the collections in the Japanese Cabinet Library.)

Dimensions 
 1st volume size : Width 280cm x Height 187.5cm
 2nd volume size : Width 279cm x Height 187.5cm

Notes

References

External links 
 
 (The National Archives of Japan Digital Archive / The National Archives of Japan)

See also 
 Enryakuji Temple
 Mount Hiei
 
 Ph.D. in Buddhist Studies and a Japanese Buddhist monk of the Tendai sect.

Historic Sites of Japan
Buddhist temples in Shiga Prefecture
World Heritage Sites in Japan
Tendai
Tendai temples
Edo period
Maps of Japan